Rakovec is a village in the municipality of Čaška, North Macedonia.

Demographics
According to the 2021 census, the village had a total of 36 inhabitants. Ethnic groups in the village include:

Macedonians 33
 Others 3

References

Villages in Čaška Municipality